Mashg Duzan (also Romanized as Mashg Dūzān; also known as Mashk Dūzān and Moshg Doozan) is a village in Manj Rural District, Manj District, Lordegan County, Chaharmahal and Bakhtiari Province, Iran. At the 2006 census, its population was 299, in 50 families. The village is populated by Lurs.

References 

Populated places in Lordegan County
Luri settlements in Chaharmahal and Bakhtiari Province